Zonda may refer to:

 Pagani Zonda, a mid-engine sports car
 Zonda (horse), retired New Zealand Thoroughbred racehorse
 Zonda Department, an administrative subdivision of San Juan Province in Argentina
 Zonda Home, a publisher of data related to real estate in North America
 Zonda Telecom, a Mexican telecommunications company
 Zonda wind, a regional term for the foehn wind that often occurs on the eastern slope of the Andes, in Argentina